Čabradský Vrbovok is a village and municipality in the Krupina District of the Banská Bystrica Region of Slovakia.

The village is best known for the ruins of Čabraď Castle.

History
The village was first mentioned in 1135 as Werbouch(later as 1262 Werbouk Inferior, 1285 Warabuk, 1342 Werbok). In 1256 King Bela IV moved colonists from Hontianske Nemce to the location of Čabradský Vrbovok. The village belonged to the Čabraď Castle and the Hunt family. In the 15th century the village became a royal property and in 1513 it belonged to the feudatory Tamas Bakóczy. Also in the 15th century it was besieged by the Bohemian Jan Jiskra. Later on it belonged to the Erdődy and Pálffy families. Between 1547 and 1549 it passed to the noble man Melichar Balassa, in 1584 to the local family Illésházy and in 1622 to the yeoman Koháry. In 1817 it belonged to the Coburg family.

Genealogical resources

The records for genealogical research are available at the state archive "Statny Archiv in Banska Bystrica, Presov, Slovakia"

 Roman Catholic church records (births/marriages/deaths): 1749-1895 (parish A)
 Lutheran church records (births/marriages/deaths): 1728-1896 (parish B)

See also
 List of municipalities and towns in Slovakia

References

External links
 
 
http://www.statistics.sk/mosmis/eng/run.html
http://www.e-obce.sk/obec/cabradskyvrbovok/cabradsky-vrbovok.html
http://www.regionhont.sk
http://www.tourist-channel.sk/hrady/indexen.php3
Surnames of living people in Cabradsky Vrbovok

Villages and municipalities in Krupina District